Solovăstru is a commune in Mureș County, Transylvania, Romania that is composed of two villages, Jabenița (Görgénysóakna) and Solovăstru.

It is traversed east to west by the Gurghiu River, an affluent of the Mureș. It is surrounded to the east by Gurghiu commune, to the west by the city of Reghin, to the south by Beica de Jos commune, and to the north by Ideciu de Jos commune.

As of 2011, Solovăstru had a population of 2,888, of which 85% were Romanians and 10.6% Romani.

Natives
 Virginia Zeani

See also
List of Hungarian exonyms (Mureș County)

References

Communes in Mureș County
Localities in Transylvania